|}

The Easter Stakes was a Listed flat horse race in Great Britain open to three-year-old colts and geldings. It was run over a distance of 1 mile (1,609 metres) at Kempton Park on Easter Saturday.

It was run for the last time in April 2009.

History
The Easter Stakes was originally run on turf and served as a trial for various colts' Classics in Europe.

The race was transferred to Kempton's newly opened Polytrack circuit in 2006. It was demoted from Listed status after the 2009 running, when the three-year average of its winners' ratings failed to reach the required level, and the name was dropped.

The ungraded version of the Conditions race which replaced it was initially backed by 32Red. The bookmaking company Betfred became its sponsor in 2012.

Records
Leading jockey since 1979 (3 wins):
 Pat Eddery – Zelphi (1988), Two O'Clock Jump (1995), Prince Tum Tum (2003)
 John Reid – Lunar Mover (1989), Lucky Lindy (1992), Right Win (1993)

Leading trainer since 1979 (7 wins):
 Richard Hannon Sr. – Lucky Lindy (1992), Right Win (1993), Two O'Clock Jump (1995), Regiment (1996), Pelham (1997), Asset (2006), Pure Poetry (2009)

Winners since 1979

 The 2009 winner Pure Poetry was later exported to Hong Kong and renamed Cheerful Delights.

See also
 Horseracing in Great Britain
 List of British flat horse races

References

 Paris-Turf:
 Racing Post:
 , 
 pedigreequery.com – Easter Stakes – Kempton.

Flat horse races for three-year-olds
Kempton Park Racecourse
Flat races in Great Britain
Recurring sporting events disestablished in 2009
Discontinued horse races